Božović (Cyrillic: Божовић, ; plural: Božovići, Божовићи) is Serbian surname, and is one of the most common surnames in Serbia and Montenegro. It derives from personal name Božo (Божо), cognate of the English name Theodor. The part ov designates possession: Božov means Božo's. The suffix ić is a diminutive designation, or descendant designation. Thus the last name can be translated as Božo's son or Božo's daughter.

There are several families in Serbia, Montenegro, and Bosnia and Herzegovina who carry this last name. The most numerous and the most prominent of the Božovići are the Serbian Old Herzegovina clan of Božovići, who are originally from the Piva River region. More of the Božovići are found in Eastern Herzegovina, in the Užice region, and in Kosovo. Despite the common last name, they are not mutually related.

People with last name Božović:
Bojan Božović, footballer, born 1985
Janko Božović, Austrian handball player
Milivoje Božović, basketball player
Miodrag Božović, coach
Mladen Božović, footballer, born 1984
Petar Božović, actor
Radoman Božović, former Prime Minister of Serbia
Saša Božović (1912–1995), Serbian doctor, writer and antifascist
Vladimir Božović, footballer, born 1981
Vojin Božović, football player and manager, born 1913
Vukajlo Božović, military commander
Recipients of the Order of the People's Hero of Yugoslavia:
Božo Božović (1907-1993)
Vlado Božović (1915-2010)
Vukosav Božović (1916-1943)
Dragoljub Božović Žuća (1922-1943)
Radislav Božović Raško (1910-1942)
Radomir Božović Raco (1915-2000)

References

Serbian surnames